Rimbach is a river of Baden-Württemberg, Germany. It is the left headstream of the Herrgottsbach.

References

See also
List of rivers of Baden-Württemberg

Rivers of Baden-Württemberg
Rivers of Germany

de:Herrgottsbach (Tauber)#Rimbach